Charles Clement Johnston (April 30, 1795 – June 17, 1832) was a U.S. Representative from Virginia.

Biography
Born in Prince Edward County, Virginia, and educated at home, he moved with his parents to his grandfather's house, Panicello, near Abingdon, Virginia, in 1811. He studied law and was admitted to the bar in 1818 and commenced practice in Abingdon, Virginia. He was elected as a Jacksonian Democrat to the 22nd Congress and served from March 4, 1831, until his death by drowning near one of the docks in Alexandria, DC at the age of 37, on June 17, 1832. Johnston is interred in the Congressional Cemetery in Washington, D.C.

His brother Joseph E. Johnston, was a Confederate general and also, much later, a U.S. Representative. The Johnston political family of Virginia also includes a nephew, John W. Johnston, who was a United States Senator, and grandnephew Henry Bowen, also a U.S. Representative for Virginia.

See also
List of United States Congress members who died in office (1790–1899)

References

External links
Charles Clement Johnston entry at The Political Graveyard

1795 births
1832 deaths
Charles Clement
Accidental deaths in Virginia
American people of Scottish descent
Burials at the Congressional Cemetery
Deaths by drowning in the United States
Politicians from Abingdon, Virginia
People from Prince Edward County, Virginia
Virginia lawyers
Jacksonian members of the United States House of Representatives from Virginia
19th-century American politicians
19th-century American lawyers